Armiñon is a town and municipality located in the province of Álava, in the Basque Country, northern Spain. The municipality also includes the towns of Estavillo and Lacorzana.

References

External links
 ARMIÑÓN in the Bernardo Estornés Lasa - Auñamendi Encyclopedia 

Municipalities in Álava